The Mughal Harem was the harem of Mughal emperors of the Indian subcontinent. The term originated with the Near East, meaning a "forbidden place; sacrosanct, sanctum", and etymologically related to the Arabic  ḥarīm, "a sacred inviolable place; female members of the family" and  ḥarām, "forbidden; sacred".   It has the same meaning as the Turkish word seraglio and the Persian word zenana. It is also similar to the Sanskrit word anthapura, meaning ‘the inner apartment’ of the household. It came to mean the sphere of women in what was usually a polygynous household and their segregated quarters which were forbidden to men.

The Harem, being a forbidden place, was constant topic of speculation and curiosity.  It was a vibrant and a big physical space where women were arranged in regard to their proximity to the Emperor.

History

The women
Harems were composed of wives and female relatives of the Mughals.  Most women usually entered the Harem through marriage, birth, appointments or as gifts.

The women were governed through strict rules of Purdah, and they could not move out of the harem as they liked, but many women travelled for affairs of pilgrimage to local shrines, hunting and sightseeing with the Emperor.  They always moved out in decorated palanquins or on the back of the elephants.  Inside the Harem, they led a materially luxurious and a comfortable life.

The Harem had gardens, fountains and water channels attached to it.  There were various departments within the Mughal Harem that fulfilled the basic needs of its inmates.  The food was provided from the Royal Kitchen known as Bawarchikhana and the Akbar Khanah provided drinking water and wine.   The Ritab Khanah was in charge of supplying bread and the Maywa Khanah provided fruits to the household.  Things of personal use such as dresses, jewellery, fancy articles and other household items were provided by the Imperial Karkhanah.

Hierarchy
The harem was not just a place where women lived.  Babies were born and children grew up there.   Within the precincts of the harem were markets, bazaars, laundries, kitchens, playgrounds, schools and baths.

The harem had a hierarchy, its chief authorities being the wives and female relatives of the emperor and below them were the concubines.    Mothers, step-mothers, aunts, grandmothers, step-sisters, sisters, daughters and other female relatives lived in the harem.    There were also ladies-in-waiting, servants, maids, cooks, women, officials, and guards.

The harem of the Mughal Empire was guarded by eunuchs, as well as female warriors called Urdubegis.

Reform of Akbar

With the construction of Fatehpur Sikri, Emperor Akbar saw need to organize the administration of his Zenana.  This portion of the palace was reputably home to more than five thousand women.    While Abu'l-Fazl ibn Mubarak claims in the Akbarnama that each woman had her own suite of rooms, it is more likely that only members of the royal family and favorites of the emperor had their own apartments.

The zenana was divided into sections, with (female) daroghas tending to the organizational needs of the residents, and working to keep the peace. Other administrative positions within the zenana included the tehwildars, or accounts officers responsible for the salaries and financial requests of the zenana inhabitants.   The mahaldar, the female servant of highest authority,  often acted as an intelligence source from the zenana directly to the emperor.  The anagas, or royal wet-nurses, were elevated to positions of rank though their purpose was not strictly administrative.

Business activity

Mughal women had control over the financial resources and were involved in various economic activities.  They enjoyed annual incomes and used eunuchs as agents of commerce.   Many women also commissioned buildings and gardens.  Shah Jahan's daughter, Jahanara Begum contributed in many architectural projects of Shah Jahan's new capital, Shahjahanabad and she as well as her sister, Roshanara enjoyed an annual income often equal to that of high imperial mansabdars.   They also had a strong administrative control over the domestic trade and gained large revenues from various towns.    Jahanara received revenues from the port city of Surat, which was a profitable centre of overseas trade, Nur Jahan by system of tolls from internal trade had an income of 230,000 mahmudis.   They combined their Economic sense with Political Activities to strengthen the monarchy and the empire.

Humayun Nama

The Humayun Nama provides an insight into the lives of Mughal women.   It was written by Gulbadan Begum, who was Humayun's sister.  She describes in great detail the conflicts and tensions in the empire and how women played a mediating role in resolving them. 
For instance, Gulbadan Begum and Hamida Bano brought about peace in the household when Salim revolted against his father in 1601.   She also indicates that women knew about the political changes going on in their world and how they played a role in them.   For example, she was approached by the traitor Mirza Kamran to write a letter to his brother asking him to join Kamran's campaign against the emperor.

See also 
 Seraglio
 Anthapura
 The Mughal Harem by K. S. Lal

References

External links 
 Inside the Harem of the Mughals
 Rajput Ladies in Mughal Harem
  Royal Mughal Ladies and Their Contributions
 Role of Persian Noblewomen at the Mughal Court

 
Women's quarters
Purdah
Slavery in India